Eusebio Kino is a bronze sculpture depicting the Italian Jesuit, missionary, geographer, explorer, cartographer and astronomer of the same name by Suzanne Silvercruys, installed in the United States Capitol Visitor Center's Emancipation Hall, in Washington, D.C., as part of the National Statuary Hall Collection. The statue was gifted by the U.S. state of Arizona in 1965.

See also
 1965 in art

References

External links
 

1965 establishments in Washington, D.C.
Bronze sculptures in Washington, D.C.
Monuments and memorials in Washington, D.C.
Kino
Sculptures of men in Washington, D.C.